Alexis Tomassian (sometimes credited as Alexis Thomassian, born 13 July 1979) is a French actor who specializes in dubbing.

Biography

Filmography

Television animation
All Grown Up! (Tommy Pickles)
American Dragon: Jake Long (Jake Long)
Avatar: The Last Airbender (Zuko)
The Batman (Dick Grayson/Robin)
Batman: The Brave and the Bold (Black Lightning, Kamandi, Speedy, Robin)
Ben 10: Alien Force (Ben Tennyson)
The Cuphead Show (Cuphead)
Death Note (Light Yagami)
Digimon (Matt Ishida, Gomamon)
DuckTales (2017 TV series) (Dewey)
The Fairly OddParents (Foop)
Futurama (Philip J. Fry (Season 1-5), Nibbler (Season 1-3))
Goof Troop (P.J.)
Kim Possible (Ron Stoppable)
Martin Mystery (Martin Mystery)
The New Batman Adventures (Tim Drake/Robin)
Adventures of Sonic the Hedgehog (Opening's singer)
Rugrats (Tommy Pickles)
ReBoot (Enzo)
Quack Pack (Dewey)

Theatrical animation
A Goofy Movie (P.J.)
Ice Age: The Meltdown (Eddie)
Nausicaä of the Valley of the Wind (Asbel)
Zombillenium (Steven)

Video games
Crash Nitro Kart (Dingodile)
Crash Twinsanity (Moritz of the Evil Twins, Dingodile)
The Chronicles of Narnia: Prince Caspian (Caspian X)
Kingdom Hearts II (Chicken Little)

Live Action
8 Mile (Jimmy "B. Rabbit" Smith Jr.)
Bring It On (Cliff Pintone)
Garden State (Andrew Largeman)
The Good Girl (Holden Worther)
Harvard Man (Alan Jensen)
Indiana Jones and the Kingdom of the Crystal Skull (Mutt Williams)
Jackass: The Movie (Steve-O)
Jackass Number Two (Steve-O)
Life as a House (Sam Monroe)
Mr. & Mrs. Smith (Benjamin "The Tank" Danz)
Rocky Balboa (Robert Balboa)
The Rules of Attraction (Paul Denton)
Seabiscuit (John "Red" Pollard)
Speed Racer (Speed Racer)
Superbad (Evan)
Versus (Prisoner KSC2-303)
War of the Worlds (Robbie Ferrier)

External links

Tomassian's profile on Planete Jeunesse (in French)

1979 births
Living people
French male actors
French male voice actors
French people of Armenian descent
French child singers
French male stage actors
People from Alfortville